The Goulphar Lighthouse (Phare de Goulphar or Grand Phare de Kervilahouen) is a lighthouse on Belle-Île-en-Mer in France. It is a granite tower combining the technical buildings and the keepers' lodgings, designed by Augustin Fresnel.

Goulphar was listed as Monument historique in 1995.

See also 

 List of lighthouses in France

References

External links 

 

Lighthouses completed in 1836
Buildings and structures in Morbihan
Lighthouses in Brittany
Monuments historiques of Morbihan
Tourist attractions in Morbihan